Prong is an American heavy metal band formed in 1986. The band was originally composed of founder Tommy Victor (vocals, guitar), along with Mike Kirkland (bass) and ex-Swans drummer Ted Parsons. Their first two studio releases, the EP Primitive Origins (1987) and debut studio album Force Fed (1989), were released independently and directed more towards the hardcore punk. The trio signed with Epic Records, and their first major label release, 1990's Beg to Differ, was a minor success, and received regular exposure on MTV's Headbangers Ball. Former Flotsam and Jetsam bassist Troy Gregory replaced Kirkland for 1991's Prove You Wrong. Gregory was soon replaced by ex-Killing Joke bassist Paul Raven, plus keyboardist John Bechdel (ex-Murder Inc.) for 1994's Cleansing. The album marked a change of direction towards a more industrial sound, being regarded as Prong's "most varied record". Prong would disband following 1996's "less inspired" Rude Awakening.

Prong was reformed in early 2002, after a five-year hiatus with a new lineup, tour, and subsequent signed to the Spanish Locomotive Music label to release their first live album, 100% Live  (not including the 1990 promo Live at CBGB's), followed by 2003's Scorpio Rising. In 2007, the band signed to Al Jourgensen's 13th Planet label, releasing Power of the Damager. In 2012, the band released Carved into Stone, followed by Ruining Lives (2014), the cover album Songs from the Black Hole (2015) and then two more albums, X – No Absolutes (2016) and Zero Days (2017).



Studio albums

Live albums

Remix albums

Extended plays

Singles

Video albums

Music videos

Other appearances

References

External links
 Prong's official website

Heavy metal group discographies
Discographies of American artists